The Ministry of Public Works and Housing of the Republic of Somaliland (MoPWH)  is a ministry of the Somaliland cabinet responsible for public works, land affairs and housing projects.
The current minister is Abdirashid Haji Duale.

Ministers of Public works

See also
 Ministry of Interior (Somaliland)
 Ministry of Finance (Somaliland)
 Somaliland National Armed Forces
 Politics of Somaliland

References

External links
Official Site of the Government of Somaliland

Politics of Somaliland
Government ministries of Somaliland